Melodrama refers to a dramatic work which exaggerates plot and characters in order to appeal to the emotions

Melodrama may also refer to:

 Melodrama (Daumier painting), c. 1860
 Melodrama (The Crash album), 2003
 Melodrama (Vibe Tribe album), 2004
 Melodrama (Joel Kroeker album), 2004
 Melodrama (Lorde album), 2017
Melodrama World Tour, held 2017–18 to promote the Lorde album

See also

 
 

 Melodrama/Random/Melbourne, a 2018 Australian film
 Melodrama Habibi, a 2008 Lebanese film
 Melodrama Publishing, an independent publishing company founded by Crystal Lacey Winslow
 Melodramma, a term in Italian opera